Marin Yvonne Ireland is an American actress. Known for her work in theatre and independent films, The New York Times deemed Ireland "one of the great drama queens of the New York stage". Her accolades include a Theatre World Award and nominations for an Independent Spirit Award and a Tony Award.

Following a series of minor roles in the Law & Order franchise (2003–2008), Ireland earned praise for starring in Neil LaBute's play Reasons to Be Pretty (2008), and was nominated for the Tony Award for Best Featured Actress in a Play. After appearing in the films Rachel Getting Married (2008) and The Understudy (2008), her starring role in Glass Chin (2014) earned her a nomination for the Independent Spirit Award for Best Supporting Female. She played Julia Bowman in the Amazon Studios series Sneaky Pete (2015–2019).

Ireland's other film roles include the acclaimed productions The Family Fang (2015), Hell or High Water (2016), Piercing (2018), The Miseducation of Cameron Post (2018) and The Irishman (2019). She additionally has played Sissy in the Netflix series The Umbrella Academy (2020–present) and Nora Brady in the Hulu series Y: The Last Man (2021). Her leading role in the horror film The Dark and the Wicked (2020) earned praise.

Early life
Ireland was born and raised in Camarillo, California. She studied at the Idyllwild Arts Foundation in Idyllwild-Pine Cove, California and earned a Bachelor of Fine Arts degree from The Hartt School, the performing-arts conservatory at the University of Hartford in West Hartford, Connecticut.

Career

Ireland made her off-Broadway theatre debut in Nocturne (2001), a play written by Adam Rapp, which ran at the New York Theatre Workshop. She also appeared in the play during its run in the American Repertory Theatre New Stages presentation at the Hasty Pudding Theatre, Cambridge, Massachusetts in October 2000. Her off-Broadway work includes Caryl Churchill's Far Away (2002) at the New York Theatre Workshop. She played the title role in Sabina (2005) by Willy Holtzman at Primary Stages. 

Ireland was featured in the 2008 stage adaptation of The Beebo Brinker Chronicles, a series of lesbian pulp fiction novels by Ann Bannon. She made her Broadway theatre debut in Reasons to Be Pretty (2009). For this performance, she received a nomination for the Tony Award for Best Featured Actress in a Play, and won the Theatre World Award. She then appeared in After Miss Julie in a Roundabout Theatre Company presentation of a Donmar Warehouse production at the American Airlines Theatre in September through December 2009. Ireland in the New Group revival of A Lie of the Mind in February and March 2010. 

Ireland's early film roles are the drama Rachel Getting Married (2008) and the comedy The Understudy (2008). In 2012 she played the female lead role in the Matt Ross debut film 28 Hotel Rooms. For playing Ellen Doyle in Glass Chin (2014), she earned a nomination for the Independent Spirit Award for Best Supporting Female. In November 2012, she starred in the title role of Marie Antoinette in the world premiere at the Yale Repertory Theatre. She starred in the Lincoln Center Theatre production of Abe Koogler's Kill Floor in 2015. She has also appeared in the films The Family Fang (2015), Hell or High Water (2016), Piercing (2018), The Miseducation of Cameron Post (2018) and The Irishman (2019). 

Ireland has gained prominence in television industry, notably for her roles as Julia in the Amazon series Sneaky Pete (2015–2019), Sissy in the Netflix series The Umbrella Academy (2020–present) and Nora Brady in the Hulu post-apocalyptic drama series Y: The Last Man (2021). Her leading role in the horror film The Dark and the Wicked (2020) earned her awards from a number of film festivals.

Ireland has narrated several audiobooks, including bestsellers by Frederik Backman, Anthony Doerr, and Amor Towles. She was awarded an Audie Award for Best Female Narrator in 2020 for her recording of "Nothing to See Here" by Kevin Wilson.

Filmography

Screen credits

Film

Television

Theater credits

Accolades

Major associations

Other awards and nominations

References

External links

 
 
 
 
 Del Signore, John (April 21, 2009). "Marin Ireland, Actor". Gothamist. Accessed January 6, 2010.

Living people
American film actresses
American stage actresses
American television actresses
University of Hartford Hartt School alumni
People from Camarillo, California
University of Hartford alumni
21st-century American actresses
Theatre World Award winners
Actresses from California
Year of birth missing (living people)